Goran Tufegdžić (born 15 November 1971) is a Serbian football coach and former player. He was the manager of Al-Wakrah in Qatar Stars League from February to June 2015. He was also the head coach of Kuwait national football team from 2009 until 2013.

Career
Tufegdžić started his playing career at FK Mladi Radnik in the second division in 1987, and was selected to play for the Yugoslav Olympic side in 1989. He coached FK Mladi Radnik in 1999–2000 and worked at the Serbia FA Football School in 2001–2002, before flying off to Kuwait to work as a head coach to Al-Qadissiya. He returned to Serbia to manage former club FK Mladi Radnik in 2003–2004 and helped the club to promotion, before working as an assistant coach at Al-Qadissiya for two seasons in 2005–2006 and 2006–2007. Helped guide lowly Al-Shabab to top flight in 2007–08 season.

Under Tufegdžić, Kuwait had played 31 matches, winning 13 matches, drawing 14 and losing four matches with a goals record of 53 goals scored and 29 goals against. On 26 October 2013, he was appointed the head coach of Al-Ettifaq, replacing German Theo Bücker. During second half of the season 2015–16, Tufegdžić was appointed the head coach of Al Wakrah Club, Qatar and saved club from relegation. Season 2016–17 he was working as head coach of UAE pro league Kalba SC. Season 2017–18 he guided Baniyas FC, securing first place in UAE First Division league with remarkable winning percentage of 72,73.

Managerial statistics

Achievements
Kuwait
WAFF Championship: 2010
Gulf Cup of Nations: 2010
Baniyas
UAE First Division League: 2018
Records
1st place - Kuwait Premier League 2002 /2003		
3rd place - Al Kharafi Champion Cup 2003 / 2004	
1st place - Crown Prince Cup 2003 /2004		
1st place - Kuwait Premier League 2003 / 2004		
1st place - Al-Ameer Cup 2003 / 2004
(First time in Kuwait history club win all competition in one season 2003/04)			
2nd place - 1st Division Serbian League 2004 / 2005	
3rd place - 1st Division Serbian League 2005 / 2006
1st place - Al-Ameer Cup 2006 / 2007
Semi Finals - Asian Champion League 2006 / 2007
Finals - Gulf Cup 2006 / 2007
1st place - 1st Division Kuwaiti League 2007 / 2008
Semi Finals-Arabian Golf Cup 19 Oman 2009
2nd place - Qualification for AFC in Qatar 2011
1st place - 6th West Asian Football Federation Championship 2010.
1st place—20th Arabian Gulf Cup - Jemen 2010
1st place—tournament in Jordan 2011 (FUCHS)
3rd place - Arab Games in Doha 2011
- Kuwait national football team declared as most developed national team in Asia (2010/2011)
3rd place - Arab Gulf Cup Bahrain 2013
1st place - UAE First Division league 2017/2018
(awarded as best coach of the league for 2017/2018 season)

References

 

1971 births
Living people
Sportspeople from Požarevac
Serbian footballers
Association football midfielders
FK Mladi Radnik players
Serbian football managers
Qadsia SC managers
Al-Shabab SC (Kuwait) managers
Kuwait national football team managers
Al-Wakrah SC managers
Al-Ittihad Kalba SC managers
Baniyas SC managers
Fujairah FC managers
Serbian expatriate football managers
Expatriate football managers in Qatar
Serbian expatriate sportspeople in Qatar
Expatriate football managers in Kuwait
Serbian expatriate sportspeople in Kuwait
Expatriate football managers in Saudi Arabia
Serbian expatriate sportspeople in Saudi Arabia
Expatriate football managers in the United Arab Emirates
Serbian expatriate sportspeople in the United Arab Emirates
UAE Pro League managers
2011 AFC Asian Cup managers